Irina Khromacheva and Arina Rodionova were the defending champions but chose not to participate.

Aliona Bolsova and Rebeka Masarova won the title, defeating Misaki Doi and Beatrice Gumulya in the final, 7–5, 1–6, [10–3].

Seeds

Draw

Draw

References

External Links
Main Draw

Torneig Internacional Els Gorchs - Doubles